The Thirty-Sixth Wisconsin Legislature convened from  to  in regular session.

This was the first legislative session after the redistricting of the Senate and Assembly according to an act of the previous session.

This session also saw the implementation of an 1881 amendment to the Constitution of Wisconsin. The amendment converted the Legislature from annual sessions to biennial sessions, and doubled the length of terms for legislative officeholders.

Senators representing odd-numbered districts were newly elected for this session and were serving the first two years of a four-year term. Assembly members were elected to a two-year term. Assembly members and odd-numbered senators were elected in the general election of November 7, 1882. Senators representing even-numbered districts had been elected in the general election of November 8, 1881, and their term was extended from two years to three years, with the end of their term coinciding with the end of this (36th) legislative term.

Major events
 January 10, 1883: The Newhall House Hotel Fire in Milwaukee killed 73 people, including former Wisconsin state senator and judge George B. Reed.
 January 20, 1883: The 1883 Tehachapi train wreck resulted in 15 deaths, including former Wisconsin congressman Charles H. Larrabee.
 October 15, 1883: The United States Supreme Court decided the Civil Rights Cases, striking down parts of the Civil Rights Act of 1875 and permitting individuals and corporations to discriminate based on race.
 November 8, 1883: The partially-constructed south wing of the Wisconsin State Capitol collapsed, killing six laborers and wounding 15 others.
 November 15, 1883: The United States and Canada implemented five standard time zones for the North American continent.
 April 20, 1884: Pope Leo XIII published the encyclical Humanum genus, denouncing Freemasonry and certain liberal beliefs which he considered to be associated with it.
 May 1, 1884: The eight-hour workday was proclaimed by the Federation of Organized Trades and Labor Unions in the United States. The date would later become recognized in nearly every industrialized country as May Day or Labour Day.
 October 22, 1884: The International Meridian Conference in Washington, D.C., established the Greenwich meridian as the prime meridian.
 November 4, 1884: 1884 United States general election:
 Grover Cleveland elected President of the United States.
 Jeremiah McLain Rusk re-elected as Governor of Wisconsin.
 December 6, 1884: The Washington Monument was completed in Washington, D.C., becoming the tallest structure in the world at that time.

Major legislation
 March 9, 1883: An Act relating to electors and general elections, and amendatory of sections 12 and 14, chapter 5, of the revised statutes, 1883 Act 29.  Established that eligible voters in Wisconsin can vote in any precinct where they had been residents for at least ten days prior to the election. It also established that a person could be disqualified from voting if they were convicted of bribery, or found to be gambling on election outcomes.
 April 3, 1883: An act to create a bureau of labor statistics, 1883 Act 319.

Party summary

Senate summary

Assembly summary

Sessions
 1st Regular session: January 10, 1883April 4, 1883

Leaders

Senate leadership
 President of the Senate: Sam S. Fifield (R)
 President pro tempore: George W. Ryland (R)

Assembly leadership
 Speaker of the Assembly: Earl Finch (D)

Members

Members of the Senate
Members of the Senate for the Thirty-Sixth Wisconsin Legislature:

Members of the Assembly
Members of the Assembly for the Thirty-Sixth Wisconsin Legislature:

Committees

Senate committees
 Senate Committee on Agriculture
 Senate Committee on Assessment and Collection of Taxes
 Senate Committee on Education
 Senate Committee on Engrossed Bills
 Senate Committee on Enrolled Bills
 Senate Committee on Federal Relations
 Senate Committee on Finance, Banks, and Insurance
 Senate Committee on Incorporations
 Senate Committee on the Judiciary
 Senate Committee on Legislative Expenditures
 Senate Committee on Manufactures and Commerce
 Senate Committee on Military Affairs
 Senate Committee on Privileges and Elections
 Senate Committee on Public Lands
 Senate Committee on Railroads
 Senate Committee on Roads and Bridges
 Senate Committee on State Affairs
 Senate Committee on Town and County Organizations

Assembly committees
 Assembly Committee on Agriculture
 Assembly Committee on Assessment and Collection of Taxes
 Assembly Committee on Bills on their Third Reading
 Assembly Committee on Cities
 Assembly Committee on Education
 Assembly Committee on Engrossed Bills
 Assembly Committee on Enrolled Bills
 Assembly Committee on Federal Relations
 Assembly Committee on Incorporations
 Assembly Committee on Insurance, Banks, and Banking
 Assembly Committee on the Judiciary
 Assembly Committee on Legislative Expenditures
 Assembly Committee on Lumber and Manufactures
 Assembly Committee on Medical Societies
 Assembly Committee on Militia
 Assembly Committee on Privileges and Elections
 Assembly Committee on Public Improvements
 Assembly Committee on Public Lands
 Assembly Committee on Railroads
 Assembly Committee on Roads and Bridges
 Assembly Committee on State Affairs
 Assembly Committee on Town and County Organization
 Assembly Committee on Ways and Means

Joint committees
 Joint Committee on Charitable and Penal Institutions
 Joint Committee on Claims
 Joint Committee on Printing

Changes from the 35th Legislature
New districts for the 36th Legislature were defined in 1882 Wisconsin Act 242, passed into law in the 35th Wisconsin Legislature.

Senate redistricting

Summary of changes
 23 Senate districts were left unchanged (or were only renumbered).
 Dane County went from having 2 districts to 1 (26).

Partisan implications
 Republicans had 18 safe seats, down from 20.
 Democrats had 6 safe seats, no change from the previous map.
 9 seats were competitive, up from 7.

Senate districts

Assembly redistricting

Summary of changes
 51 Assembly districts were left unchanged (or were only renumbered).
 Adams and Marquette counties were combined into a shared district after previously being separate districts.
 Brown County went from having 3 districts to 2.
 Calumet County went from having its 1 district to having 1 whole district and 1 shared district with Outagamie County.
 Chippewa County became its own district after previously having been in a shared district with Price.
 Clark and Wood counties each became their own Assembly districts after previously having been in a shared district with Lincoln and Taylor counties.
 Dane County went from having 3 districts to 5.
 Fond du Lac County went from having 4 districts to 3.
 Jefferson County went from having 3 districts to 2.
 Juneau County went from having 2 districts to 1.
 The northeast corner of the state, comprising Florence, Langlade, Marinette, Oconto, and Shawano counties, went from 1 shared district to 3.
 Milwaukee County went from having 11 districts to 12.
 Pepin County became its own district after previously having been in a shared district with Buffalo County.
 Polk County became its own district after previously having been in a shared district with Ashland, Barron, Bayfield, Burnett, and Douglas counties.
 Walworth County went from having 3 districts to 2.
 Richland County went from having 2 districts to 1.
 Waukesha County went from having 2 districts to 1.
 Winnebago County went from having 4 districts to 3.

Assembly districts

Employees

Senate employees
 Chief Clerk: Charles E. Bross
 Assistant Clerk: J. W. Bates
 Bookkeeper: Oliver Munson
 Engrossing Clerk: Thomas Bright
 Enrolling Clerk: James T. Greene
 Transcribing Clerk: Samuel S. Lockhart
 Proofreader: Willard W. Flinn
 Clerk for the Judiciary Committee: A. T. E. Blessing
 Clerk for the Committee on Enrolled Bills: Stephen Thomas
 Clerk for the Committee on Engrossed Bills: E. S. Hotchkiss
 Clerk for the Committee on Claims: J. H. Whitney
 Document Clerk: Thomas Watson
 Sergeant-at-Arms: Adelbert D. Thorp
 Assistant Sergeant-at-Arms: Charles A. Landridge
 Postmaster: H. C. Spaulding
 Assistant Postmaster: John J. Marshall
 Gallery Attendant: Claus Johnson
 Committee Room Attendant: A. A. Curtis
 Document Room Attendant: Frank Hutson
 Doorkeepers:
 Joseph Granvogel
 H. T. E. Tilleson
 Jos. S. Adlington
 Jos. W. Hodges
 Porter: O. L. Wright
 Night Watch: G. W. Churchill
 Janitor: Owen Pritchard
 Messengers:
 Charlie Adamson
 Lemuel R. Parry
 Emile Forgeot
 Fred. D. Irish
 Elliot B. Davis
 A. M. Kneeland
 Dennie M. Wright

Assembly employees
 Chief Clerk: Isaac T. Carr
 1st Assistant Clerk: James W. Murphy
 2nd Assistant Clerk: J. L. O'Connor
 Bookkeeper: Clarence L. Clark
 Engrossing Clerk: C. R. Blumenfeld
 Enrolling Clerk: Charles N. Holden
 Transcribing Clerk: James Douglas
 Proofreader: George Stone
 Clark for the Judiciary Committee: Joseph Roy
 Clerk for the Committee on Enrolled Bills: W. C. Brawley
 Clerk for the Committee on Engrossed Bills: J. C. Conners
 Sergeant-at-Arms: Thomas Kennedy
 Assistant Sergeant-at-Arms: Bernard McGinty
 Postmaster: T. W. Wiebold
 Assistant Postmaster: William H. Fitzgerald
 Doorkeepers:
 Byron Abert
 John D. Bradford
 O. B. Phelps
 Fireman: Frank Grams
 Gallery Attendants:
 T. F. McCarty
 Michael Riedy
 Engrossing Room Attendant: J. B. Rand
 Policeman: John W. Liebenstein
 Night Watch: A. H. Burns
 Wash Room Attendant: Matthew Dunne
 Messengers:
 W. G. Kropf
 H. Allman
 J. F. Donovan

References

External links
 1883: Related Documents from Wisconsin Legislature

1883 in Wisconsin
Wisconsin
Wisconsin legislative sessions